A central bank digital currency (CBDC) (also called digital fiat currency or digital base money) is a digital currency issued by a central bank, rather than by a commercial bank. It is also a liability of the central bank and denominated in the sovereign currency, as is the case with physical banknotes and coins.

Rather than a new currency, CBDC is a form of central bank electronic money that could be used by households and businesses to make payments. A report by the Bank for International Settlements states that, although the term "central bank digital currency" is not well-defined, "it is envisioned by most to be a new form of central bank money [...] that is different from balances in traditional reserve or settlement accounts.".

The present concept of CBDCs differs from virtual currency and cryptocurrency in that a CBDC is or would be issued by a state. Most CBDC implementations will likely not use or need any sort of distributed ledger such as a blockchain.

Most Central Banks worldwide are now in various stages of their evaluation of launching their national digital currencies. According to ECB's chief Christine Lagarde, more than 80 central banks are looking at digital currencies. China's digital RMB was the first digital currency to be issued by a major economy. As of January 2023, five central banks have launched a CBDC: the Central Bank of The Bahamas (Sand Dollar), the Eastern Caribbean Central Bank (DCash), the Central Bank of Nigeria (e-Naira), the Bank of Jamaica (JamDex), and the Reserve Bank of India (Digital Rupee).

Some states have also issued, or have considered issuing, cryptocurrencies: these include Venezuela (Petro) and the Marshall Islands (Sovereign). These cryptocurrencies are often considered with the intent of increasing a state's independence from global financial systems, such as by reducing dependence on a foreign currency or by evading international sanctions.

Contrasting attitudes towards digital currencies were demonstrated by developments in the UK and Switzerland in February 2023. The UK Treasury and the Bank of England said a state-backed digital pound was likely to be launched some time after 2025. Two weeks later, a Swiss lobby group triggered a national vote on maintaining a "sufficient quantity" of cash in circulation over fears that electronic payments make it easier for the state to monitor its citizens' actions. In a comment on the British government’s plans, the BBC's Faisal Islam said the issue was about access to the data attached to every spending transaction, and whether people might choose to trust a global company more than the state: "The eye here is on maintaining UK monetary sovereignty against upheaval from the likes of Big Tech."

History 

Central banks have directly implemented e-money previously, such as Finland's Avant stored value e-money card in the 1990s. In 2000, the  project was launched in Czechia, enabling the implementation of so-called micropayments on the Internet. For payments, users used the virtual currency Q, the fair value of which is tied to a fixed exchange rate against the Czech koruna in the ratio of 100 Q = CZK 1. The two currencies are fully convertible. Project I LIKE Q was terminated in 2003 due to an amendment to Czech law, which at that time did not provide for this form of payment. In 2021, the same group introduced project  which is a type of digital currency enriched with smart contracts aka drone money.

The present concept of "central bank digital currency" is known concept in the field of economics, whereby the central bank enables citizens to hold accounts with it, providing a reliable and safe public savings or payments medium ("retail" or "general-purpose" CBDC).

The Bank for International Settlements (BIS) published a report in December 2020 listing the known CBDC wholesale and retail projects at that time. By April 2021, there would be "at least 80 central banks around the world that are looking at digital currencies."

Another 2020 BIS survey found that 86% of central banks were examining the advantages and disadvantages of launching CBDCs, although only 14% were in advanced stages of development (such as pilot programs).

Implementation 
A central bank digital currency would likely be implemented using a database run by the central bank, government, or approved private-sector entities. The database would keep a record (with appropriate privacy and cryptographic protections) of the amount of money held by every entity, such as people and corporations.

In contrast to cryptocurrency, a central bank digital currency would be centrally controlled (even if it was on a distributed database), and so a blockchain or other distributed ledger would likely not be required or useful - even as they were the original inspiration for the concept.

Characteristics
A CBDC is a high-security digital instrument; like paper banknotes, it is a means of payment, a unit of account, and a store of value. And like paper currency, each unit is uniquely identifiable to prevent counterfeiting. CBDC will have implications for commercial banks, probably in the field of lowering banks' commissions, no big customer data-selling ability, accumulating the deposits and deposit policies and credit policies due to higher funding costs for banks. 
 
Digital fiat currency is part of the base money supply, together with other forms of the currency. As such, DFC is a liability of the central bank just as physical currency is. It is a digital bearer instrument that can be stored, transferred and transmitted by all kinds of digital payment systems and services. The validity of the digital fiat currency is independent of the digital payment systems storing and transferring the digital fiat currency.

Proposals for CBDC implementation often involve the provision of universal bank accounts at the central banks for all citizens.

Benefits and impacts
Central bank digital currency are being studied and tested by governments and central banks in order to realize the many positive implications it contributes to financial inclusion, economic growth, technology innovation and increased transaction efficiencies. Here is a list of potential advantages:
 Technological efficiency: instead of relying on intermediaries such as banks and clearing houses, money transfers and payments could be made in real time, directly from the payer to the payee.  Being real time has some advantages:
 Reduces risk: payment for goods and services often needs to be done in a timely manner and when payment verification is slow, merchants usually accept the risk of some payments not succeeding in exchange for faster service to customers. When these risks are eliminated with instant payment verifications, merchants no longer need to use intermediaries to handle the risk or to absorb the risk cost themselves.
 Reduces complexity: merchants will not need to separately keep track of transactions that are slow (where the customer claims to have paid but the money has not arrived yet), therefore eliminate the waiting queue, which could simplify the transaction process from payment to rendition of goods/services.
Reduces (or eliminates) transaction fees: current payment systems like Visa, Mastercard, American Express etc. have a fee attached to each transaction and lowering or eliminating these fees could lead to widespread price drops and increased adoption of digital payments.
 Financial inclusion: safe money accounts at the central banks could constitute a strong instrument of financial inclusion, allowing any legal resident or citizen to be provided with a free or low-cost basic bank account.
 Preventing illicit activity: A CBDC makes it feasible for a central bank to keep track of the exact location of every unit of the currency (assuming the more probable centralized, database form)
 Tax collection: It makes tax avoidance and tax evasion much more difficult, since it would become impossible to use methods such as offshore banking and unreported employment to hide financial activity from the central bank or government. However, cryptos like Bitcoin  risk undermining effort to crack down on corporate tax avoidance. 
 Combating crime: It makes it much easier to spot criminal activity (by observing financial activity), and thus put an end to it. Furthermore, in cases where criminal activity has already occurred, tracking makes it much harder to successfully launder money, and it would often be straightforward to instantly reverse a transaction and return money to the victim of the crime.
 Proof of transaction: a digital record exists to prove that money changed hands between two parties which avoids problems inherent to cash such as short-changing, cash theft and conflicting testimonies.
 Protection of money as a public utility: digital currencies issued by central banks would provide a modern alternative to physical cash – whose abolition is currently being envisaged.
 Safety of payments systems: A secure and standard interoperable digital payment instrument issued and governed by a Central Bank and used as the national digital payment instruments boosts confidence in privately controlled money systems and increases trust in the entire national payment system while also boosting competition in payment systems. 
 Preservation of seigniorage income: public digital currency issuance would avoid a predictable reduction of seigniorage income for governments in the event of a disappearance of physical cash.
 Banking competition: the provision of free bank accounts at the central bank offering complete safety of money deposits could strengthen competition between banks to attract bank deposits, for example by offering once again remunerated sight deposits.
 Monetary policy transmission: the issuance of central bank base money through transfers to the public could constitute a new channel for monetary policy transmission (i.e. helicopter money), which would allow more direct control of the money supply than indirect tools such as quantitative easing and interest rates, and possibly lead the way towards a full reserve banking system. In digital Yuan trial in Shenzhen, the CBDC was programmed with an expiration date, which encouraged spending and discouraged money from sitting in a saving account. In the end, 90% of vouchers were spent in shops. Demurrage could be implemented, such as by shaving off fractions of the value on a scheduled basis, as a supplement to traditional inflation targets.
 Financial safety: CBDC would provide an alternative to fractional reserve banking for daily uses, for those who want to avoid all risk of bank runs, despite the relative safety provided by deposit insurance.

Risks 
Despite having potential advantages, CBDCs remain a controversial topic, and there are risks associated with their implementation.

 Banking system disintermediation: With the ability to provide digital currency directly to its citizens, one concern is that depositors would shift out of the banking system.

Indeed, in the last century, commercial banks have created money thanks to deposits in addition to a number of other ways. Formally they have used 2 methods: fractional reserve banking and zero reserve.
 
Zero reserve: Today, commercial banks in some countries (US, UK, EU, etc) don't need a reserve requirement anymore. Indeed, every time a subject (a person, a corporation, etc) asks for a loan, and that subject offers a loan guarantee (a private property like a car, a building, etc), the bank temporarily creates a new deposit (money), lends this money to them, and when the borrower pays off the loan plus the interest the initial deposit is deleted, and the bank keeps the interest.

In the real world, zero reserve and fractional reserve are the same, because the banks are able to avoid the reserve requirements.

CBDCs are fully reserved, so if a person wants this form of money, they just buy it from the central bank. In this case commercial banks don't create debt or new money, and they don't earn any interest.

Customers may deem the safety, liquidity, solvibility, and publicity of CBDCs to be more attractive, weakening the balance sheet position of commercial banks. In the extreme, this could precipitate potential bank runs and thus make banks' funding positions weaker. However, the Bank of England found that if the introduction of CBDC follows a set of core principles, the risk of a system-wide run from bank deposits to CBDC is addressed. A central bank could also limit the demand of CBDCs by setting a ceiling on the amount of holdings.

 Centralization: Since most central bank digital currencies are centralized, rather than decentralized like most cryptocurrencies, the controllers of the issuance of CBDCs can add or remove money from anyone's account with a flip of a switch. In contrast, cryptocurrencies with a distributed ledger such as Bitcoin prevent this unless a group of users controlling more than 50% of mining power is in agreement.
 Digital dollarization: A well-run foreign digital currency could become a replacement for a local currency for the same reasons as those described in dollarization. The announcement of Facebook's Libra contributed to the increased attention to CBDCs by central bankers, as well as China's progress with DCEP to that of several Asian economies.
 Privacy: 
 "Governments have direct visibility of financial transactions", an "eagle-eyed view on the spending of everyone". 
 Digital currency would give a country "broad new powers when it comes to surveillance and controlling its population."
 Data from tracing money routes could lead to losing financial privacy if the CBDC implementation does not have adequate privacy protections. This could lead to encouraging of self-censorship, deterioration of freedom of expression and association, and ultimately to stalling social developments.
 Government Social Manipulation: 
 Digital currency "will simply become an extension of the surveillance state" and "it could see citizens fined in a split second for behaviors deemed undesirable. Dissidents and activists could see their wallets emptied or taken offline."
 Limiting individual freedom: "Digital currencies could also empower the state to make it impossible to donate to a vocal NGO"
 Limiting or prohibiting purchases of products: Digital currency could prohibit a "purchase alcohol on a weekday. "
 Digital currency " is also programmable. The government could theoretically give out money that expires within a certain period of time or money that could only be used on certain items, which could be used to induce behaviour that the government is seeking."
 Direct interaction with individuals: "In times of crisis, they enable governments to send aid and stimulus payments directly to the smartphones of affected citizens, regardless of whether the recipients have a bank account."
 Forcing consumer behavior: "Digital currencies can also be tailored to specific purposes. For example, in the Chinese pilot program, money has an expiration date of a few weeks because authorities are hoping to drive consumption"

References

External links 

 Today's Central Bank Digital Currencies Status

 
Monetary reform
Numismatics